Ralph Steingruber (born 15 January 1967) is a retired Swiss footballer who played as defender or midfielder in the 1990s and 2000s.

Steingruber played his youth football by BSC Old Boys and advanced to their first team in 1991. After playing two seasons with them he moved on.

Steingruber joined FC Basel for their 1993–94 season under head-coach Claude Andrey. After playing in five test games, Steingruber played his domestic league debut for his new club in the away game on 14 August 1993 as Basel won 3–0 against SR Delémont. Steingruber scored his first goal for his club one week later, on 19 August in the home game in the St. Jakob Stadium as Basel won 4–0 against Urania Genève Sport.

During this season his team mates were the likes of Swiss international goalkeeper Stefan Huber, defenders Massimo Ceccaroni, Marco Walker and Samir Tabakovic, the midfielders Mario Cantaluppi, Martin Jeitziner, Admir Smajić and Ørjan Berg and the Swiss international striker Dario Zuffi. Together they won the promotion/relegation group and as Nationalliga B champions thus won promotion to the top flight of Swiss football, after six seasons in the second tier. He stayed with the club for another season as they played in the 1994–95 Nationalliga A.

In his two seasons with the club, Steingruber played a total of 77 games for Basel scoring a total of seven goals. 43 of these games were in the Nationalliga A, eight in the Swiss Cup and 26 were friendly games. He scored two goals in the domestic league, one in the cup and the other four were scored during the test games.

After his time with Basel, Ralph Steingruber moved on to play one season for FC St. Gallen in top flight and then three seasons for Wil in the second tier of Swiss football. Steingruber then ended his professional football career and played two seasons as an amateur with FC Hinwil. He then returned to region Basel and ended his playing career after six seasons with FC Breitenbach.

References

Sources
 Rotblau: Jahrbuch Saison 2017/2018. Publisher: FC Basel Marketing AG. 
 Die ersten 125 Jahre. Publisher: Josef Zindel im Friedrich Reinhardt Verlag, Basel. 
 Verein "Basler Fussballarchiv" Homepage

1967 births
Living people
Swiss men's footballers
BSC Old Boys players
FC Basel players
FC St. Gallen players
FC Wil players
Association football defenders
Association football midfielders
Swiss Super League players
Swiss Challenge League players